In the Court of the Crimson King (subtitled An Observation by King Crimson) is the debut studio album by English rock band King Crimson, released on 10 October 1969 by Island Records. The album is one of the earliest and most influential of the progressive rock genre, where the band combined the musical influences that rock music was founded upon with elements of jazz, classical, and symphonic music.

The album reached number five on the UK Albums Chart and number 28 on the US Billboard 200, where it was certified Gold by the Recording Industry Association of America.

Production

Composition
The song "I Talk to the Wind" was written for King Crimson predecessor group Giles, Giles and Fripp (the only song on the album for which this was the case), but was retained by King Crimson in order to show the group's soft side. According to lyricist Peter Sinfield, the song was influenced by Joni Mitchell; in a 1997 interview, he said it is still his favourite lyric that he ever wrote.

"The Court of the Crimson King" was written by keyboardist/woodwinds player Ian McDonald and Sinfield for their earlier group The Creation, and started as a country and western song before its final progressive rock configuration.

Recording 
Multiple sources state that King Crimson made their live debut on 9 April 1969 at The Speakeasy Club in London, but King Crimson had played an earlier show in February 1969 at the Change Is club in Newcastle. The Speakeasy Club concert, which Sinfield describes as their second, was smashed up by members of The Pink Fairies Drinking Club. King Crimson opened for the Rolling Stones in Hyde Park, London in July 1969, before an estimated 250,000 to 500,000 people, which brought them positive attention.

Initial sessions for the album were held in early 1969 with producer Tony Clarke, most famous for his work with The Moody Blues. After these sessions failed to work out, the group were given permission to produce the album themselves. The album was recorded on a 1" 8-channel recorder at Wessex Sound Studios in London, engineered by Robin Thompson and assisted by Tony Page. In order to achieve the characteristic lush, orchestral sounds on the album, Ian McDonald spent many hours overdubbing layers of Mellotron and various woodwind and reed instruments. In some cases, the band went through 5 tape generations to attain deeply layered, segued tracks.

While supervising a mastering cut, Ian McDonald discovered that the copy master had a problem on the right track, and because the first generation master tapes were missing since 1969, this problem was compensated for by EQ until 2002. Fripp speculated that the problem was caused by incompetent mastering engineers or "some tapes were mastered in different countries on machines that were not very well maintained or from copies made in the source country (normally US or UK in the case of rock music) where the second machine was inadequately maintained/monitored. These tapes were then sent out to licensee countries who had no adequate measure of comparison & trusted the source material from the record company office. Tape machines running at different speeds occasionally resulted in albums being a couple of seconds shorter/longer". The first generation master tapes were found in Virgin archives in 2002.

Packaging 
Barry Godber (1946–1970), a computer programmer friend of Sinfield's, painted the design for the album cover. He used his own face, viewed through a mirror, as the model. Godber died in February 1970 from a heart attack, shortly after the album's release. It was his only album cover; the original painting is now owned by Robert Fripp. Fripp had said about Godber's artwork:

Release 
The album reached No. 5 on the UK Albums Chart and No. 28 on the US Billboard 200, where it was certified Gold by the Recording Industry Association of America.

Reissues 
In the Court of the Crimson King was reissued several times in the 1980s and 1990s through Polydor and E.G. Records, with pressings made from copies that were several generations removed from the stereo sub-master tape. This resulted in sub-par audio quality and audible tape hiss.

In 1982, Mobile Fidelity Sound Lab released a half speed mastered version of the album on vinyl, cut by Stan Ricker with the Ortofon Cutting System. In 1989 the album was remastered for its debut on CD by Robert Fripp and Tony Arnold, this version was part of "The Definitive Edition" series, which consisted of other remastered albums by the band. In 1999, in commemoration of its 30th anniversary, the album was remastered again, this time using 24 bit and HDCD technology by Simon Heyworth, Robert Fripp and David Singleton, this edition was part of the "30th Anniversary Edition" series, which consisted of remastered editions of King Crimson back-catalogue for their thirtieth anniversaries. Three years later, in 2002, the original masters were discovered in the Virgin archives, with splicing tape still present between the various songs, and crossfade between "I Talk to the Wind" and "Epitaph" yet to be created. In 2004, a new remaster was done by Simon Heyworth using these first-generation stereo master tapes and it was released the same year with a 12-page booklet, this release was called "Original Master Edition" and used the same HDCD and 24 bit technology as the 1999 remaster.

In October 2009, Fripp collaborated with musician and producer Steven Wilson to remix the original master recordings in a new stereo and 5.1 surround sound mix, released as the album's 40th Anniversary edition. The album was sold as three different packages: a two-CD set with the old and new stereo versions, a CD and DVD set with the new stereo and surround sound mixes, and a six-disc (5 CD/1 DVD) box with all mixes and bonus audio and video tracks.

In 2010, the original 1969 stereo mix was remastered and reissued on 200-gram super-heavyweight vinyl. This edition was cut by John Dent at Loud Mastering, it was approved by Robert Fripp and included a download code for a 320 kbit/s transfer of the original 1969 vinyl.

In 2019, the album was remixed in 5.1 and stereo by Steven Wilson once again for a 50th anniversary box set of the album. Wilson expressed satisfaction with his 2009 remix, but stated that his 50th anniversary mixes are a significant improvement, being more faithful to the original 1969 mix and benefitting from his 10 years of ensuing experience. The box set includes 3 CDs and a Blu-ray. The Blu-ray features the all-new 2019 stereo and 5.1 mixes encoded at 24/96 resolution, the 2004 "Original Master Edition" with the 1969 mix (also encoded at 24/96), a complete alternate version of the album comprising 2019 Steven Wilson mixes and 2019 instrumental mixes while the three CDs in the box set feature the new 2019 stereo mix, an expanded edition of the alternate album in the Blu-ray and the "Original Master Edition" plus additional tracks.

Reception 

In the Court of the Crimson King received acclaim in the British music press. In NME, Nick Logan said that although the album lacked the impact of their live concerts, the diverse musical influences from pop, jazz and classical music had produced a result that was "totally original and always captivating", and stating that "King Crimson, on this showing, have it in them to be huge." Melody Maker also noted that the album did not fully capture the power of the band's live performances, but that it "still packs tremendous impact", and that "this is one you should try to hear". Disc and Music Echo  described the album as "a brilliant mixture of melody and freakout, fast and slow, atmospheric and electric, all heightened by the words of Peter Sinfield". The magazine stated that "this must be heard as a complete entity" and concluded that it would "establish King Crimson as a major talent". In the US, John Morthland of Rolling Stone said King Crimson had "combined aspects of many musical forms to create a surreal work of force and originality". However, Village Voice critic Robert Christgau called the album "ersatz shit".

Later reviews of In the Court of the Crimson King have been positive, with AllMusic praising it "[a]s if somehow prophetic, King Crimson projected a darker and edgier brand of post-psychedelic rock" in its original review by Lindsay Planer, and calling it "definitive" and "daring" in its current review. In Classic Rock reviews of King Crimson's 2009 reissues, Alexander Milas described In the Court of the Crimson King as the album which "blew off the doors of musical convention and cemented these quintessentially British innovators' place in rock history for all time".

In his 1997 book Rocking the Classics, critic and musicologist Edward Macan notes that In the Court of the Crimson King "may be the most influential progressive rock album ever released". Macan went on to argue that In the Court of the Crimson King presented an example of every significant element of a mature progressive rock genre. Further, Macan mentions that the album coalesces prog rock tropes and conventions, some of which are only established in the future, into a single congestable medium. The impact of these developments, in his eyes, is the album representing but also influencing the overall musical impact of progressive rock as a whole for decades to come. Paul Stump's History of Progressive Rock, published the same year, stated that "If Progressive rock as a discrete genre can be said to have had a starting point, In the Court of the Crimson King is probably it. All the elements that characterize Progressive's maturity are in place: jazz and blues influences are subservient to intense compositional rigour characterized by Mellotron-induced Western classical symphonic arrangements ... Individual and collective passages of arresting virtuosity and a rhythmic discontinuity bordering on the perverse are also components of an essentially tonal, approachable whole inoffensive to any classical or pop listener." Stump further commented that while the album is defined by avant-garde sensibility and subtle arrangements, it still communicates through the accessible language of rockers.

Legacy 
The Who's Pete Townshend was quoted as calling the album "an uncanny masterpiece". In the Q & Mojo Classic Special Edition Pink Floyd & The Story of Prog Rock, the album came fourth in its list of "40 Cosmic Rock Albums". The album was named as one of Classic Rock magazine's "50 Albums That Built Prog Rock". In 2014, readers of Rhythm voted it the eighth greatest drumming album in the history of progressive rock. In 2015, Rolling Stone named In the Court of the Crimson King the second greatest progressive rock album of all time, behind Pink Floyd's The Dark Side of the Moon. The album is also featured in the book 1001 Albums You Must Hear Before You Die. It was voted number 193 in Colin Larkin's All Time Top 1000 Albums.

Rap artist Kanye West used samples of "21st Century Schizoid Man" in his song "Power", from his 2010 album My Beautiful Dark Twisted Fantasy. In a 2022 lawsuit by Declan Colgan Music Ltd, the owners of the mechanical licence for the song, they claimed that West had sampled it without a licence.

Track listing 

 After the end of The Court of the Crimson King, there is a hidden track run from 9:41 to 10:00 on some pressings.
 The timings on the inner sleeve of original pressings, giving a total album time of 41:59, are incorrect.

Personnel
King Crimson
Greg Lake – lead vocals, bass guitar, production
Robert Fripp – electric and acoustic guitars, production
Ian McDonald – saxophone, flute, clarinet, bass clarinet, Mellotron, harpsichord, piano, organ, vibraphone, backing vocals, co-lead vocals on "I Talk to the Wind", production
Michael Giles – drums, percussion, backing vocals, production
Peter Sinfield – lyrics, illumination, production

Production
Robin Thompson – recording engineer
Tony Page – assistant engineer
Barry Godber – cover illustrations

Charts

Certifications

References

1969 debut albums
Island Records albums
Atlantic Records albums
Polydor Records albums
E.G. Records albums
Vertigo Records albums
Virgin Records albums
King Crimson albums
Albums produced by Robert Fripp
Albums produced by Ian McDonald (musician)
Albums produced by Greg Lake
Albums produced by Michael Giles
Albums produced by Peter Sinfield